Polish landed gentry  (from ziemia, "land") was a social group or class of hereditary landowners who held manorial estates. Historically, ziemianie consisted of hereditary nobles (szlachta) and landed commoners (kmiecie; Latin: cmethones).<ref name="kmiecie--guzowski">{{cite journal
| last = Guzowski
| first = Piotr
| date = 1 May 2014
| title = Village court records and peasant credit in fifteenth- and sixteenth-century Poland
| url = https://www.academia.edu/7481437
| journal = Continuity and Change
| location = Cambridge, East of England, ENGLAND, UNITED KINGDOM
| publisher = Cambridge University Press
| volume = 29
| issue = 1
| pages = 118
| doi = 10.1017/S0268416014000101
| s2cid = 145766720
| access-date = 9 Oct 2014
| quote = The most important and the most numerous section of the peasantry in late medieval and early modern Poland was the kmiecie (Latin: cmethones), full peasant holders of hereditary farms with an average size in the region under study of half a mansus, which was equivalent to eight hectares. Farms belonging to kmiecie were largely self-sufficient, although some of them were, to varying extents, engaged in production for the market. Other, less numerous, sections of the peasantry were the zagrodnicy (Latin: ortulani), or smallholders, and the ogrodnicy, or cottagers, who farmed small plots of land. These two categories of peasants were not able to support themselves and their families from their land, so they earned extra money as hired labourers on their landlords’ land, or that of the kmiecie. Apart from the holders of large or small farms, Polish villages were also inhabited by so-called komornicy, landless lodgers who earned wages locally. This group included village craftsmen, while the wealthiest kmiecie included millers and innkeepers.}}</ref> The Statutes of Piotrków (1496) restricted the right to hold manorial lordships to hereditary nobility. The non-nobles thus had to either sell their estates to the lords or seek a formal ennoblement for themselves (not an easy task), or had their property taken away. A rare exception was the burgesses of certain specially privileged "ennobled" royal cities who were titled "nobilis" and were allowed to buy and inherit manorial estates and exercise their privileges (such as jurisdiction over their subjects) and monopolies (over distilleries, hunting grounds, etc.). Therefore, in the szlachta-dominated Polish–Lithuanian Commonwealth there was almost no landed gentry in the English meaning of the term, i.e. commoners who owned landed estates. With the Partitions these restrictions were loosened and finally any commoner could buy or inherit land. This made the 20th-century Polish landed gentry consist mostly of hereditary nobles, but also of others.

They were the lesser members of the szlachta, contrasting with the much smaller but more powerful group of "magnate" families (sing. magnat, plural magnaci in Polish), see "Magnates of Poland and Lithuania". Compared to the situation in England and some other parts of Europe, these two parts of the overall "nobility" to a large extent operated as different classes, and were often in conflict. After the Partitions of Poland, at least in the stereotypes of 19th-century nationalist lore, the magnates often made themselves at home in the capitals and courts of the partitioning powers, while the gentry remained on their estates, keeping the national culture alive (for a preserved, non-magnate example, see Dąbrowski Manor in Michałowice).

20th century
Although the March Constitution of Poland (1921) abolished the legal class of hereditary nobility, szlachta or ziemiaństwo'' was informally recognized and remained an economic and social reality as well as a politically influential group, to a degree greater than hereditary nobility in European countries with more highly developed capitalism (and the remnants of feudalism mostly gone). 

At the end of World War II, because of the Polish Land Reform Act passed in 1944 by the Polish Committee of National Liberation, landed gentry with larger estates was dispossessed and eliminated as a social group. Many land-owning families were eliminated or had their estates confiscated by the Germans or Soviets, earlier during the war.

With the liquidation of the Polish People's Republic (1989), the descendants of Polish landed gentry became politically active, struggling for (and often succeeding in) restoration of land ownership or at least compensation. Attempts to delegitimize the land reform of 1944 have also been made.

References

T. Chrzanowski, "Dziedzictwo. Ziemianie polscy i ich udział w życiu narodu", Kraków, Znak, 1995

 
Gentry